Kemnath is a small town in the district of Tirschenreuth, in Bavaria, Germany. It is situated near the Fichtelgebirge, 24 km southeast of Bayreuth.  The town's motto is "das Tor zur Oberpfalz," which translates into English as "The Door to the Upper Palatinate."

History
Kemnath was first referenced in historical documents on 6 July 1008 by the Holy Roman Emperor Henry II when he donated Keminata to the Diocese of Bamberg. In 2008, Kemnath celebrated its 1000th anniversary with a series of special events throughout the town culminating in a major celebration in August 2008.

Geography
The town is in the foothills of the Fichtelgebirge Mountains of northeast Bavaria and is approximately 55 km from the Czech border at Mähring. It is located in a valley formed by three streams, the Mühlbach, Flötzbach, and Schirnitzbach. The Steinwald Nature Park abuts the edge of the town as well and stretches from Kemnath to the Czech border.

Economy
The two largest employers in Kemnath are the Ponnath Meat Processing plant and a Siemens Healthineers production facility.

References

External links
 Official homepage of the town of Kemnath (In German)

Tirschenreuth (district)